ATPase, H+ transporting, lysosomal 38kDa, V0 subunit d2 is a protein in humans that is encoded by the ATP6V0D2 gene.

It is part of proton pumps in the plasma membranes of osteoclasts and aids with extracellular acidification in bone resorption.

References

External links

Further reading 

Genes on human chromosome 8